The 1980 World Snooker Championship (also known as the 1980 Embassy World Snooker Championship for sponsorship reasons) was a ranking professional snooker tournament that took place from 22 April to 5 May 1980 at the Crucible Theatre in Sheffield, England. Organised by the World Professional Billiards and Snooker Association (WPBSA), it was the fourth consecutive World Snooker Championship to be held at the Crucible, the first tournament having taken place in 1977.

A qualifying event for the championship was held across three different venues, producing eight qualifiers who joined the 16 invited seeded players in the main event. The tournament was broadcast in the United Kingdom by the BBC, and was sponsored by the Embassy cigarette company. The winner received £15,000 from the total prize fund of £60,000.

Cliff Thorburn met the 1972 champion Alex Higgins in the final, which was a best-of-35- match. Thorburn won the match 18–16, to become the first world champion from outside the United Kingdom in the sport's modern era. There were 11 century breaks compiled during the championship, the highest of which was 136, achieved by both Kirk Stevens and Steve Davis.

Overview
The World Snooker Championship is an annual professional snooker tournament organised by the World Professional Billiards and Snooker Association (WPBSA). Founded in the late 19th century by British Army soldiers stationed in India, the cue sport was popular in the British Isles. However, in the modern era, which started in 1969 when the World Championship reverted to a knockout format, it has become increasingly popular worldwide, especially in East and Southeast Asian nations such as China, Hong Kong and Thailand.

Joe Davis won the first World Championship in 1927, hosted by the Billiards Association and Control Council, the final match being held at Camkin's Hall in Birmingham, England. Since 1977, the event has been held at the Crucible Theatre in Sheffield, England. The 1980 championship featured 24 professional players competing in one-on-one snooker matches in a single-elimination format, each match played over several . These competitors in the main tournament were selected using a combination of the top players in the snooker world rankings and the winners of a pre-tournament qualification stage. At the start of the main event, defending champion Terry Griffiths and six-time champion Ray Reardon were joint bookmakers' favourites, both priced at 3–1, with Higgins the third-favourite priced at 7–1.

The championship extended the number of participants who played at the Crucible from 16 to 24, with the top eight seeded players being placed in round 2 of the draw. The duration of the event, which had been 13 days in each of the three previous years, was increased to 14 days, with the semi-finals being reduced to best-of-31 frames (from best-of-37 in 1979) and the final to the best-of-35 frames (from best-of-47 in 1979). There had been a third place playoff in 1978 and 1979, but this was not continued in 1980. The competition was promoted by Mike Watterson, and received 70 hours of television coverage by the BBC in the United Kingdom, attracting 14.5 million viewers for the conclusion of the final. The tournament was a ranking event, and was sponsored by cigarette company Embassy.

Prize fund
The breakdown of prize money for this year is shown below: 

 Winner: £15,000
 Runner-up: £8,000
 Semi-final: £4,000
 Quarter-final: £2,000
 Last 16: £1,500
 Last 24: £750
 Highest break: £1,000
 Championship record break (143 or above): £5,000 (not awarded)
 Maximum break: £10,000 (not awarded)
 Total: £60,000

Tournament summary

Qualifying
Qualifying matches took place across three venues: at Romiley Forum, Stockport, from 5 April to 18 April 1980, at the Redwood Lodge Country Club, Bristol, from 11 April to 16 April 1980, and at Sheffield Snooker Centre from 12 April to 17 April 1980. The qualifying rounds produced eight players who progressed to the main event, where they met the 16 invited seeded players.

The 1957 runner-up Jackie Rea defeated Bernard Bennett 9–1 before being eliminated 1–9 by Willie Thorne. Thorne was on course to make a maximum break in the first frame, but missed an easy  after  eleven  and ten blacks. Steve Davis qualified after defeating Chris Ross 9–3 and Paddy Morgan 9–0. Kingsley Kennerley, in his first competitive match since 1974, lost 2–9 to Mike Hallett. Pat Houlihan, playing without his contact lenses due to conjunctivitis, compiled the only century break of the qualifying rounds, 108 during a 9–6 victory over Joe Johnson, but lost 1–9 in his following match to Tony Meo. Jim Wych progressed to the main event with a 9–7 win against Rex Williams, the world champion of English billiards.

First round
The first round took place between 22 and 25 April, each match played over either two or three scheduled sessions as the best of 19 frames. Meo, Wych, Cliff Wilson, Ray Edmonds, and Jim Meadowcroft made their Crucible debuts.

Steve Davis led Patsy Fagan 6–3 after their first session, and won 10–6. Fagan had led 2–0, but from 5–6 lost four of the following five frames. Meo was 5–4 ahead of Alex Higgins after their first session, and at 9–8 was a frame away from winning before Higgins took the last two frames with breaks of 77 and 62 to progress. Kirk Stevens compiled a break of 136 in the third frame against Graham Miles, missing the final black that would have made it an all-time championship record 143. After leading Miles 6–0 then 9–3 after the first two sessions, Stevens won 10–3. John Virgo won all six frames of his first session against Meadowcroft, with Meadowcroft winning two of the first three frames in the second session before being eliminated 2–10.

Wilson, the reigning World Amateur Snooker Champion, won the first frame against Doug Mountjoy on the black as part of a 66 clearance, and took a 4–1 lead before finishing the first session at 5–4. Wilson then lost six of the last seven frames, resulting in a 6–10 loss. Mountjoy recorded a break of 104 in the fourteenth frame. Wych won 10–5 against former champion John Pulman after leading 5–4. This was Pulman's final appearance at the World Championship. Edmonds had replaced his  the night before the match, and playing with the unfamiliar tip, lost the first four frames, then went 2–7 behind David Taylor before losing 3–10. Thorne, having led 3–1, took a 5–4 lead over Bill Werbeniuk with a 97 break in the ninth frame. and he led in the match until Werbeniuk, who compiled a break of 101 in the thirteenth frame, made it 7–7.

Second round

The second round, which took place between 24 and 29 April, was played as best-of-25-frames matches spread over three sessions. Defending champion Griffiths lost the first seven frames against Steve Davis, and ended the first session trailing 1–7. Davis won the opening frame of the second session to extend his lead to 8–1, and had a seven frame lead again at 10–3, before Griffiths won three frames to end the session 6–10 behind. In the third session, Griffiths won the first four frames to level at 10–10, with Davis then winning the next three to secure a 13–10 victory, which included a 116 break in the 22nd frame. The failure of first-time world snooker champions to defend their title has become known as the "Crucible curse."

Higgins won six of the eight frames in each of the first two sessions against Perrie Mans, and eliminated Mans 13–6. Despite leading 4–1 after making breaks of 95 and 108 in consecutive frames, former champion John Spencer lost in his first match for the third consecutive year, 8–13 to Stevens. Virgo took an early lead of 4–1 against Eddie Charlton, with their first session finishing 4-4. At 11–10 ahead, Virgo missed a pot on the brown, and Charlton then levelled the match 11–11. The match went to a deciding frame, where Charlton made a break of 33, and Virgo missed a black that allowed Charlton back in to win 13–12. The report in Snooker Scene characterised the match as one where the "famed tenacity" of Charlton overcame the "brittle, edgy side of Virgo's temperament."

Cliff Thorburn finished the first session against Mountjoy 3–5 behind. In the evening, Thorburn played cards and drank alcohol with friends until 5:00 am, resuming the match by winning the first five frames in succession, and going on to win 13–10, From 10 to 10 Thorburn won two frames on the pink and one on the black. The pair were level again at 8–8 before Wych won 13–10. Ray Reardon had session-end leads of 5–3 and 11–5 against Werbeniuk, and won 13–6. Fred Davis compiled a 106 break, the highest of the match, but lost 5–13 to David Taylor.

Quarter-finals
The quarter-finals were played as best-of-25-frames matches over three sessions on 29 and 30 April. Davis compiled a 136 break in the third frame against Higgins. In the eighth frame, Higgins was on course to achieve a maximum break, when he became the first player in the history of the world championship to pot black balls after each of the fifteen red balls during a break. After running out of position on the fifteenth black, he managed to pot the yellow, but failed in an attempt to then  the green ball. The pair finished their first session tied at 4–4. In the second session, the players were level at 7–7 before Higgins won the next two frames to carry a 9–7 lead into the last session, in which he won the match 13–9. It was the first time that Higgins had reached the semi-finals since 1976

Having lost the first two frames to Wych, Thorburn built a 5–3 lead at the end of their first session. and after having led 9–3 and 10–6, progressed 13–6. With Stevens's "all-out attacking" play featuring "brilliant" potting, according to Clive Everton, he was 5–3 and 10–6 in front of Charlton after the first and second sessions, and won 13–7, becoming the youngest-ever world championship semi-finalist, aged 21. Reardon had three breaks over 40 in the first frame against Taylor, and won three of the next four for 4–1, before losing the next two and then finishing the first session 5–3 up. He extended his lead to 7–3, but Taylor then won six successive frames leaving Reardon 7–9 behind at the start of the last session. Taylor added a frame, but Reardon tied at 10–10 by winning the next three. From 11 to 11, Reardon missed some easy shots as Taylor won 13–11 for what Snooker Scene described in their match report as "the best win of his career."

Semi-finals
The semi-finals took place between 1 and 3 May as best-of-31-frames matches played over four sessions. Stevens led 5–2 against Higgins after winning four frames in a row from 1–2. Their second session finished at 7–7, and Stevens made a number of mistakes during the third session, including missing a black from its spot when he was 8–9 behind, and the session ended with him 9–13 in arrears. Higgins won the first frame of the fourth session, with Stevens, successfully potting a number of long-distance shots, then taking the next two, and adding another by winning the 26th frame on the black to make it 12–14. Although Higgins appeared tense, he won the 27th frame on the pink, and went on to secure a 16–13 victory.

Thorburn was 5–3 ahead of Taylor after their first session, and having won eight consecutive frames to lead 10–3, was 11–4 up at the end of the second session. Thorburn extended his lead to 15–7 by the end of the third session, then won 16–7 with a break of 114 in the 23rd frame.

Final

The final, between Cliff Thorburn and Alex Higgins, took place on 4 and 5 May, as a best-of-35 frames match scheduled for four sessions. Thorburn had become the first player to reach a second final at the Crucible. After Thorburn won the first frame, Higgins won the next five. Thorburn won the seventh to make it 5–2, with Higgins complaining after the frame that Thorburn had been standing in his line of sight, a claim that author and sports statistician Ian Morrison called "unfounded." Higgins led 6–3 at the end of the first session, extending this to 9–5 before Thorburn levelled the match at 9–9. Writing in The Times, Sydney Friskin described the match to this point as a contrast of styles: "the shrewd cumulative processes of Thorburn against the explosive break-building of Higgins." He also noted that each player had accused the other of distracting them during the match. Thorburn won the 19th and 20th frames, with Higgins taking the following two to level at 11–11. Thorburn went ahead at 12–11 and 13–12, with Higgins then levelling the match both times, with the third session ending 13-13. In the final session, Higgins won the first frame then Thorburn won the next two, before Higgins equalised at 15–15. Thorburn led 16–15, and missed an easy  that let Higgins in to make it 16–16. With a break of 119, Thorburn moved within a frame of victory at 17–16.

The BBC's television coverage of the final had been interrupted by the broadcast of live footage of the Iranian Embassy Siege, which caused numerous viewers to complain to the broadcaster. The conclusion of the final was watched by 14.5 million television viewers. Thorburn is generally regarded as the first player from outside Britain to win the world championship, with Horace Lindrum's victory in the 1952 World Snooker Championship usually being disregarded. After the match, Higgins said of Thorburn "he's a grinder", and the nickname "The Grinder" was subsequently associated with Thorburn, seen as apt for his slow, determined style of play. Higgins also posed for pictures with a cake decorated with icing reading "World Champion 1980" that his wife Lynne had brought for him. In the Snooker world rankings 1980/1981, based on the results at the three world championships from 1978 to 1980, Thorburn was ranked second (behind Reardon) and Higgins was placed fourth. Higgins and Thorburn had an ongoing rivalry during their playing careers and were perceived as adversaries. Higgins won a second world championship in 1982, and Thorburn made the World Championship's first maximum break in 1983.

Main draw 
The results for the tournament are shown below. The numbers in brackets denote players seedings, whilst players in bold are match winners.

Qualifying 
The results from the qualifying competition are shown below, with match winners denoted in bold.

 indicates a player that was in the original draw (in January 1980) but did not compete.

First Round

Century breaks
There were 11 century breaks at the main championship. Kirk Stevens and Steve Davis shared the high break prize when they both made a 136 break. It was the first time the highest break went to two players.  There was also a £5,000 bonus on offer for compiling a higher break than the championship record of 142. The only century break in the qualifying competition was a 108 scored by Pat Houlihan in his match against Joe Johnson.

136, 116  Steve Davis
136  Kirk Stevens
123, 104  Doug Mountjoy
122  Alex Higgins
119, 114  Cliff Thorburn
108  John Spencer
106  Fred Davis
101  Bill Werbeniuk

Notes

References

1980
World Championship
World Snooker Championship
Sports competitions in Sheffield
World Snooker Championship
World Snooker Championship